The 1978–79 Northern Rugby Football League season was the 84th season of rugby league football. Sixteen English clubs competed for the Northern Rugby Football League's first division championship, with Hull Kingston Rovers claiming the title by finishing on top of the League.

Season summary

The 1978 Kangaroo tour took place during the first half of the season and involved matches between a number of clubs.

Hull Kingston Rovers won their third Championship this season.

The Challenge Cup Winners were Widnes who beat Wakefield Trinity 12-3 in the final.

Rugby League Premiership Trophy Winners were Leeds who beat Bradford Northern 24-2 in the final.

The BBC2 Floodlit Trophy Winners were Widnes who beat St. Helens 13-7 in the final.

2nd Division Champions were Hull F.C. New Hunslet, York and Blackpool Borough were also promoted to the First Division.

Geoff 'Sammy' Lloyd of Hull F.C. equalled the club match record for scoring goals when he was successful 14 times in the match against Oldham on 10 September 1978. They were part of a club record 170 goals in a season, and a club record 369 points in a season.

Widnes beat Workington Town (from Cumbria) 15–13 to win the Lancashire County Cup, and Bradford Northern beat York 18–8 to win the Yorkshire County Cup.

League Tables

Championship
Final Standings

Second Division

Challenge Cup

Widnes beat Wakefield Trinity 12-3 in the State Express Challenge Cup Final played at Wembley Stadium, London on Saturday 5 May 1979, in front of a crowd of 94,218.

This was Widnes' fifth cup final win in seven Final appearances. To date, this was Wakefield Trinity’s last appearance in a Challenge Cup Final.

The Wakefield Trinity , David Topliss, won the Lance Todd Trophy.

League Cup

Premiership

Statistics
The following are the top points scorers in the 1978–79 season.

Most tries

Most goals (including drop goals)

Kangaroo Tour

The months of September, October and November also saw the appearance of the Australian team in England on their 1978 Kangaroo Tour. Other than the three test Ashes series against Great Britain (won 2–1 by Australia), The Kangaroos played and won matches against 12 club and county representative sides as well as playing Wales in a non-test international.

The 1978 Kangaroos were coached by dual Manly-Warringah NSWRFL premiership coach Frank Stanton who had previously toured as a player in 1963–64. The team was captained by brilliant centre / stand-off Bob Fulton making his second tour after being a part of the 1973 squad.

The 11–10 loss to Widnes at Naughton Park on 25 October remains (as of 2017) the last time that the Kangaroos have lost to an English club or county team.

References

Sources
1978-79 Rugby Football League season at wigan.rlfans.com
The Challenge Cup at The Rugby Football League website

1978 in English rugby league
1979 in English rugby league
Northern Rugby Football League seasons